Tortoise is the debut studio album by American post-rock band Tortoise. It was released on June 22, 1994, on the Thrill Jockey record label.

By March 1998, Tortoise had sold 35,000 copies (8,000 LPs and 27,000 CDs).

Reception

In his review for AllMusic, Glenn Swan writes that Tortoise "share equal responsibility and trust in each other, pouring out a thick stew of meditative grooves, light production experiments, and rusty guitar-string ambience -- the likes of which have rarely sounded so approachable, but this is not to say the album is a sellout leap into commercialism. There are a couple head scratchers and murky moments that fail to make much of an impact, but the quintet have spun such a rich web of mood and personality that any fall from grace barely changes altitude".

Track listing

Personnel
Credits for Tortoise adapted from album liner notes.

Tortoise
Dan Bitney
Bundy K. Brown
John Herndon
Douglas McCombs
John McEntire

Production
Bundy K. Brown – recording (assistant), mixing (assistant)
John McEntire – recording, mixing
Tortoise – arrangement, production

Artwork and design
Sam Prekop – cover design

References

1994 albums
Tortoise (band) albums
Thrill Jockey albums